In engineering and physics, a spring system or spring network is a model of physics described as a graph with a position at each vertex and a spring of given stiffness and length along each edge. This generalizes Hooke's law to higher dimensions. This simple model can be used to solve the pose of static systems from crystal lattice to springs. A spring system can be thought of as the simplest case of the finite element method for solving problems in statics. Assuming linear springs and small deformation (or restricting to one-dimensional motion) a spring system can be cast as a (possibly overdetermined) system of linear equations or equivalently as an energy minimization problem.

Known spring lengths 
If the nominal lengths, L, of the springs are known to be 1 and 2 units respectively, then the system can be solved as follows:
Consider the simple case of three nodes connected by two springs. Then the stretching of the two springs is given as a function of the positions of the nodes by
 
where  is the matrix transpose of the incidence matrix
 
relating each degree of freedom to the direction each spring pulls on it.
The forces on the springs are

where W is a diagonal matrix giving the stiffness of every spring.
 
which gives the linear equation:
 .
Now, the matrix  is singular, because all solutions are equivalent up to rigid-body translation. Let us prescribe a Dirichlet boundary condition, e.g., . 

As an example, let W be the identity matrix then 

is the Laplacian matrix. Plugging in  we have
.
Incorporating the 2 to the left-hand side gives
.
and removing rows of the system that we already know, and simplifying, leaves us with
.
.
so we can then solve
.

See also 
 Gaussian network model
 Anisotropic Network Model
 Stiffness matrix
 Spring-mass system
 Laplacian matrix

External links 
 The Physics of Springs

Springs (mechanical)
Elasticity (physics)
Solid mechanics